The eighth and final season of Charmed, an American supernatural drama television series created by Constance M. Burge, premiered in the United States on The WB from September 25, 2005 through May 21, 2006.

Paramount Home Entertainment released the complete eighth and final season in a six-disc box set on September 11, 2007.

Cast and Characters

Main
 Alyssa Milano as Phoebe Halliwell
 Rose McGowan as Paige Matthews
 Holly Marie Combs as Piper Halliwell
 Kaley Cuoco as Billie Jenkins
 Brian Krause as Leo Wyatt

Recurring
 Jennifer Rhodes as Penny Halliwell
 James Read as Victor Bennett
 Rebecca Balding as Elise Rothman
 Brandon Quinn as Agent Murphy
 Nigel Gibbs as Jonnah
 Jason Lewis as Dex Lawson
 Ivan Sergei as Henry Mitchell
 Denise Dowse as Angel of Destiny
 Marnette Patterson as Christy Jenkins
 Victor Webster as Coop
 Leland Crooke as Candor
 Steven J. Oliver as Asmodeus
 Søren Oliver as Baliel
 Anthony Cistaro as Dumain

Guest
 Janice Dickinson as Glamoured Paige Matthews
 Glenn Morshower as Agent Keyes
 Jennifer Taylor as Eve
 Michelle Stafford as Mandi
 Peter Woodward as The Source of All Evil
 Alana de la Garza as Sylvia
 Arjay Smith as Speed
 Simon Templeman as Angel of Death
 Faran Tahir as Savard
 Drew Fuller as Chris Halliwell
 Finola Hughes as Patty Halliwell
 Scott Jaeck as Sam Wilder
 Wes Ramsey as Wyatt Halliwell

Special Musical Guest
 Liz Phair

Episodes

Reception

Ratings
The season premiere, which aired on September 25, 2005, garnered 4.27 million viewers; an increase from the 3.44 million viewers who watched the seventh-season finale. The season and series finale, "Forever Charmed", was watched by 4.49 million viewers, making it the highest rated episode of the season. The eighth season averaged 3.5 million viewers for all 22 episodes. Out of all regular primetime programming that aired during the 2005–06 U.S. television season, Charmed ranked 132nd out of 156, according to the Nielsen ratings system.

Accolades

The eighth season of Charmed was nominated for various awards.

DVD release

Notes

References

External links 
List of Charmed season 8 episodes at the Internet Movie Database
 

Charmed (TV series)
Charmed (TV series) episodes
2005 American television seasons
2006 American television seasons